Hajjiabad-e Yek (also Romanized as Ḩājjīābād-e Yek; also known as Ḩājjīābād) is a village in Qazvineh Rural District, in the Central District of Kangavar County, Kermanshah Province, Iran. At the 2006 census, its population was 62, in 15 families.

References 

Populated places in Kangavar County